The 1994 Giro d'Italia was the 77th edition of the Giro d'Italia, one of cycling's Grand Tours. The Giro began in Bologna, with a flat stage on 22 May, and Stage 12 occurred on 2 June with a stage from Bibione. The race finished in Milan on 12 June.

Stage 12
2 June 1994 — Bibione to Kranj,

Stage 13
3 June 1994 — Kranj to Lienz,

Stage 14
4 June 1994 — Lienz to Merano,

Stage 15
5 June 1994 — Merano to Aprica,

Stage 16
6 June 1994 — Sondrio to Stradella,

Stage 17
7 June 1994 — Santa Maria della Versa to Lavagna,

Stage 18

Stage 19
9 June 1994 — Lavagna to Bra,

Stage 20
10 June 1994 — Cuneo to Les Deux Alpes,

Stage 21
11 June 1994 — Les Deux Alpes to Sestriere,

Stage 22
12 June 1994 — Turin to Milan,

References

1994 Giro d'Italia
Giro d'Italia stages